Ngô Vĩnh Long (April 10, 1944 – October 12, 2022) was a Vietnamese American historian, a professor of History at the University of Maine from 1985 until his death.

Long was the author of the 1973 book Before the Revolution: The Vietnamese Peasants Under the French.

Long graduated from Harvard University in 1978 and was hired at the University of Maine in the Department of History in 1985. He died after a brief illness on October 12, 2022, at the age of 78.

Published Works 

 Before the Revolution: The Vietnamese Peasants Under the French 1973 M.I.T Press 
 Coming to Terms: Indochina, the United States and the War 1991 Westview Press, Coauthor Douglas Allen (philosopher)
 Vietnamese Women in Society and Revolution: The French Colonial Period 1974 Vietnam Resource Center, Cambridge, MA

References 

1944 births
2022 deaths
Vietnamese emigrants to the United Kingdom
University of Maine faculty
Vietnamese historians
Historians of Vietnam
Anti–Vietnam War activists
Harvard University alumni